Sangaris optata is a species of beetle in the family Cerambycidae. It was described by Pascoe in 1866. It is known from Colombia, Guatemala, Panama, and Honduras.

References

optata
Beetles described in 1866